Líon Na Bearnaí is an Irish bred racehorse that won the Irish Grand National in 2012. Líon na bearnaí is Irish for "Fill in the gaps," a common instruction in school textbooks.
The horse which is owned by the Lock Syndicate, trained by Tom Gibney and ridden Andrew Thornton won the Irish National by four and a half lengths at a starting price of 33–1.

Born: 2002

Sire: New Frontier (TB) - Tullaghansleek Stud

Dam: Polly Plum

Líon Na Bearnaí comes from an exceptional bloodline, with his sire, New Frontier, a Sadler's Wells horse, and on his dam's side, Mr. Prospector.

External links
Irish Racing Profile
Racingpost Profile

Racehorses bred in Ireland
Racehorses trained in Ireland
2002 racehorse births
National Hunt racehorses